The Chevrolet Grand Prix is an annual IMSA WeatherTech SportsCar Championship race held every July at Canadian Tire Motorsport Park in Bowmanville, Ontario, Canada. The race originated in 1975 and is currently a two hour and forty minute race in order to fit the event into a television-friendly package.  Previous editions of the Grand Prix were part of the World Sportscar Championship, the American Le Mans Series and the IMSA GT Championship.

History

In 1961 the first international professional sportscar races at Mosport Park took place with the inaugural Players 200 in June won by Stirling Moss and the first Canadian Grand Prix won by Peter Ryan in September as part of the Canadian Sportscar Championship. In 1966 the Grand Prix became part of the inaugural Can-Am Series season before becoming a Formula One Grand Prix in 1967. The Mosport Can-Am races continued to be part of the Can-Am series through to its demise in 1986 with the track hosting more Can-Am races than any other facility.

In 1975, the International Motor Sports Association sportscars visited the track for the first time when it’s Camel GT Challenge raced during the Labatt's Blue 5000 Weekend sharing the weekend schedule with the SCCA/USAC Formula 5000 Championship. The inaugural 100 mile IMSA race was won by Hurley Haywood in a Porsche Carrera. 

The race was included as part of the World Sports Car Championship on six occasions, for the first time in 1976 and for the final time as the 1985 Mosport 1000 which also marked the final FIA World Championship event to be held at the facility.

From 1989 through 1992, IMSA returned to headline GT only races in May and June for their GTO and GTU classes. With the launch of the new World Sports Cars category in 1995, prototypes returned to the track for the first time in a decade for the Chrysler Mosport 500.

In August of 1999, the American Le Mans Series made its first appearance at the track as the new headline IMSA sanctioned series for the renamed Grand Prix of Mosport weekend.  

The series reintroduced factory backed prototypes designed for the high speeds of the 24 Hours of Le Mans. Prototypes from Audi, BMW, Cadillac, Panoz, Porsche and Acura led to the highest speeds ever recorded at the track. The 2008 Grand Prix of Mosport included the fastest ever lap at the circuit taken by Rinaldo Capello during qualifying in an Audi R10 TDI with a time of 1:04.094. 

Mosport was one of four tracks that would appear on the American Le Mans Series schedule every year for the next fifteen years of the series existence.

In 2014, the Grand Prix continued as part of the new IMSA WeatherTech SportsCar Championship following the merger of the American Le Mans Series and the Grand-Am Rolex Sports Car Series.

In 2020 and 2021, the Grand Prix was not held for the first time in a quarter of a century due to the Covid-19 pandemic.

Winners

See also
Chevrolet Silverado 250
Mosport 200
Mosport Can-Am
Mosport Trans-Am
Canadian Grand Prix
Canadian Motorcycle Grand Prix
Telegraph Trophy 200 / Molson Diamond Indy

References

External links
United SportsCar Championship official site
Ultimate Racing History Mosport archive
World Sports Racing Prototypes WSC archive

 
Sports car races
Sport in Ontario
Clarington
Auto races in Canada
1975 establishments in Ontario
Recurring sporting events established in 1975
Tourist attractions in the Regional Municipality of Durham